Liam Hassett (born 1975 in Killorglin, County Kerry) is an Irish Gaelic footballer who has played for Laune Rangers and Dublin side St Anne's, and played at senior level for the Kerry county team between 1995 and 2005. Hassett captained Kerry to the All-Ireland SFC title in 1997. He won All-Ireland Under 21 Medals in 1995 and 1996 as captain. He also won an All-Ireland Club Championship with Laune Rangers in 1996.

He was a selector for the Kerry senior football team, under Éamonn Fitzmaurice.

References

External links
 "Laune in bid to hold onto Mike Hassett". Hogan Stand. 13 December 2000.
 Liam Hassett's 1997 All-Ireland winning speech

 

1975 births
Living people
All-Ireland-winning captains (football)
All Stars Awards winners (football)
Gaelic football selectors
Irish schoolteachers
Kerry inter-county Gaelic footballers
Laune Rangers Gaelic footballers
Munster inter-provincial Gaelic footballers
People from Killorglin
St Anne's (Dublin) Gaelic footballers
Winners of three All-Ireland medals (Gaelic football)